Acraga moorei, the tangerine furry-legs, is a moth of the family Dalceridae. It is found in Venezuela, Colombia, Brazil, Ecuador, Peru, Bolivia, Paraguay and northern Argentina. The habitat consists of tropical wet, tropical moist, tropical premontane wet, tropical premontane moist, tropical lower montane wet, tropical lower montane moist, subtropical wet, subtropical moist, subtropical lower montane moist, subtropical montane wet or rain and warm temperate moist forests.

The length of the forewings is 15–18 mm for males and 23–26 mm for females. The forewings are ochreous with dark veins, except at the costa. The hindwings are ochreous and slightly brighter than the forewings. The veins are slightly darkened near the margins. Adults are on wing year-round.

The larvae feed on Eriobotrya japonica and Coffea arabica.

References

Dalceridae
Moths described in 1898